The County of Nairn (also called Nairnshire) is a historic county, registration county and lieutenancy area of Scotland. The county was used for local administration until the county council, based at the county town of Nairn, was abolished in 1975 under the Local Government (Scotland) Act 1973, the area becoming one of the eight districts of the two-tier Highland region. This arrangement ended in 1996 when the Highland council area was made a unitary authority.

The county borders Inverness-shire to the west and south, Moray to the east, and has a coastline along the Moray Firth to its north.

Geography

The county consists of a flattish coastal region where the vast majority of the population live, with a sparsely populated hilly interior, rising to the foothills of the Grampian Mountains in the south. There is no old-established name for these heights, but they have been termed the "Nairnshire Hills". The coast forms an arc shape, with the Whiteness Head peninsula in the west and The Bar peninsula in the east. The main rivers are the River Nairn and the Findhorn, which both follow deeply incised courses across the general slope northwards. The chief bodies of water are Loch Loy, Cran Loch, Clunas Reservoir, Loch of Boath and Loch Kirkcaldy.

Nairn can be seen from several distant points such as Ben Rinnes, a peak that is a common point of distant view to such places as Inverness-shire and Longman Hill in Banffshire. To the north, Nairn is bounded by the Moray Firth.

Functions
Nairn is a land registration county.

Nairn is a lieutenancy area, defined as the district of Nairn as abolished as a local government area under the Local Government (Scotland) Act 1994.

Since 1996 it has had no formal meaning in terms of local government.

Local Government

19th century

Until 1891 Nairnshire had a number of exclaves in other counties, the most considerable of which was situated some distance away from the bulk of the county of Nairn, in the county of Inverness. Another sizable portion existed in the County of Ross, around the village of Urquhart, on the Black Isle. Other, smaller, detached parts existed in the County of Moray. Under the Local Government (Scotland) Act 1889, these detached parts became part of their host territories.

The Local Government (Scotland) Act 1889 established a uniform system of county councils in Scotland and realigned the boundaries of many of Scotland's counties. Subsequently, Nairn County Council was created in 1890. The new county council was based at Nairn Town and County Buildings. However, Nairn County Council amalgamated with Moray County Council for almost all aspects of administration in 1930.

20th century
In 1927 Nairnshire, along with many of Scotland's other counties, matriculated a coat of arms by the Lord Lyon King of Arms, the governor of Scotland's heraldry.  The arms was as follows: Or, a chevron gules, between two water-bougets in chief and a stag's head cabossed in base sable, three mullets argent.  The motto was UNITE AND BE MINDFUL.

In 1975, under the Local Government (Scotland) Act 1973, the local government council was superseded and the area (including the burgh of Nairn) became, without change of boundaries, a council district of the two-tier Highland region.

Local government council functions were divided between the regional council and the district council. For example, education was a regional responsibility, and housing was a district responsibility.

In 1996, under the Local Government etc (Scotland) Act 1994, the local government council district was merged into the unitary Highland council area.

The new unitary Highland Council adopted the areas of the former council districts as management areas. Each management area was represented, initially, by area committees consisting of councillors elected from areas (groups of local government wards) corresponding to the management areas, but changes to ward boundaries in 1999 created a mismatch between committee areas and management areas.

21st century
In 2007, following further changes to ward boundaries, the Local Government council created a new management structure, with three new corporate management areas and 16 new ward-level management areas. Therefore, Nairn is now both one of the 22 wards of the Highland council area and one of the Highland Council's 16 ward-level management areas.

The Nairn ward elects four of the council's 80 members by the single transferable vote system of election, which is designed to produce a form of proportional representation. The ward is on the boundary between the Highland council area and the Moray council area, which lies to the east.

Within the Highland area there is the Badenoch and Strathspey ward and the Inverness South ward to the south, and the Culloden and Ardersier ward to the west.

The Nairn ward is one of nine within the Highland Council's Inverness, Nairn and Badenoch and Strathspey corporate area, and the Nairn management area is one of six ward-level management areas within the corporate area.

There is significant difference between the boundaries of the new Nairn management area and those of the area abolished in 2007. The new area is smaller, part of the old area being now within the Culloden and Ardersier ward-level area and within Inverness city ward-level area 4.

Civil parishes

Civil parishes are still used for some statistical purposes, and separate census figures are published for them. As their areas have been largely unchanged since the 19th century this allows for comparison of population figures over an extended period of time.

The county consisted of the royal burgh of Nairn (chartered in 1476), the four parishes of Ardclach, Auldearn, Dyke & Moy and Nairn; and most of the parish of Cawdor (also known as Calder), and parts of those of: Croy & Dalcross; Moy & Dalarossie; Petty; and Urquhart & Logie Wester.

Parliamentary constituencies
The parliamentary constituency for the Westminster Parliament is Inverness, Nairn, Badenoch and Strathspey and the MP is Drew Hendry of the Scottish National Party.

The parliamentary constituency for the Scottish Parliament is Inverness and Nairn, represented by Fergus Ewing MSP.

Transport
The Aberdeen–Inverness railway line runs through the north of the county west–east.

Settlements

Ardclach
Auldearn
Cawdor
Clephanton
Culcharry
Delnies
Ferness
Firhall
Geddes
Glenferness
Littlemill
Nairn
Piperhill
Regoul

Notes and references

 
Former counties of Scotland
Lieutenancy areas of Scotland
Counties of the United Kingdom (1801–1922)